Geoff Charles "Jeff" Powis (June 14, 1945 – November 28, 2001) was a Canadian professional ice hockey player. Powis played ten seasons of professional ice hockey, mostly in the minor leagues, highlighted by a couple of games with the Chicago Black Hawks of the National Hockey League. Powis' brother Lynn Powis was also a professional ice hockey player.

Powis was born in Winnipeg, Manitoba. A graduate of the Saskatchewan Junior Hockey League team, Moose Jaw Canucks, Powis joined the St. Louis Braves of Central Professional Hockey League's  in 1966–67 before making his NHL debut the following year with the Chicago Black Hawks.

Powis spent the better part of the 1967–68 season with the CPHL's Dallas Black Hawks while playing in two games with Chicago before joining the International Hockey League's at Port Huron Flags in 1968–69.

Powis spent three seasons with Port Huron earning IHL First Team All-Star honors in 1969 before the franchise relocated to Toledo midway through the 1970–71 season. After moving to Toledo, Powis spent one more season with team before splitting the 1972–73 season with the Western Hockey League's Seattle Totems and Cranbrook Royals where he was a WIHL Second Team All-Star in 1973.

Throughout his career, Geoff Powis played in two NHL games.  Powis died in November 2001.

External links

Obituary at LostHockey.com

1945 births
2001 deaths
Canadian ice hockey centres
Chicago Blackhawks players
Dallas Black Hawks players
Ice hockey people from Winnipeg
Moose Jaw Canucks players
Port Huron Flags (IHL) players
Seattle Totems (WHL) players